Kilimanoor is a  Block Panchayat in Trivandrum district, Kerala, India.

Grama Panchayaths
 Pazhayakunnummel
 Pulimath
 Kilimanoor Grama Panchayath
 Nagaroor
 Madavoor
 Pallikkal (Kilimanoor)
 Karavaram
 Navaikulam

President:| Adv. Thajudeen Ahmed

External links
 Election Kerala
http://www.kerala.gov.in/dept_sc/hostels.htm
http://cyberjournalist.org.in/blocks.html

References

Villages in Thiruvananthapuram district